Vinícius da Silva Bristott, also known as Gaúcho, is a Brazilian professional basketball player. Bristott was born in Passo Fundo, Rio Grande do Sul, the southernmost state of Brazil.

Previous teams
Before signing with Araldite/Univille, Bristott has played for these teams:
Unisanta (Santos-SP)
AD Guarujá (Guarujá-SP)
Blumenau (Blumenau-SC)
Videira (Videra-SC)

Araldite/Univille - Joinville
Right after Joinville beat Bristott's previous team (Videira) in the state championship final, Bristott was hired to make part of Joinville's squad to compete in the 2009-2010 NBB season. He was mostly used as a 3rd option forward, coming in for Jefferson Sobral or Audrei Parisotto. For the first round in the 09-10 playoffs, Joinville had many injured players. Manteguinha, the starting point guard, Joao Victor, a center, and players like Sobral and Vezaro were doing some work away from Joinville. Their absences created extra time for players from the bench, and Bristott got some extra time on the court. He helped Joinville beat Vila Velha/CETAF in a 3-0 series, scoring 8 PPG, and playing for 8.4 MPG.

NBB Stats

Regular season Stats

|-
| style="text-align:left;"| 
| style="text-align:left;"| Joinville
| 10 || 0 || 10.4 || .565 || .600 || .727 || 2.4 || 0.6 || .8 || .000 || 7.00

Jogo das Estrelas
In early 2010, NBB hosted an All-Star weekend event in Uberlândia-MG. Vinícius Bristott was the selected player from Joinville to participate in the Slam Dunk contest. Bristott was eliminated on the first round, having a score only 2 points away from being able to move on to the final round. He successfully made a double-handed windmill, even though he can also do the one-handed windmill, and the eastbay dunk, as he has shown in pre-game warm-ups.

References

1981 births
Living people
Brazilian men's basketball players
Forwards (basketball)